Acetochlor is an herbicide developed by Monsanto Company and Zeneca. It is a member of the class of herbicides known as chloroacetanilides. Its mode of action is elongase inhibition, and inhibition of geranylgeranyl pyrophosphate (GGPP) cyclization enzymes, part of the gibberellin pathway. It carries high risks of environmental contamination.

Uses
In the United States, acetochlor was registered by the EPA as a direct substitute for many herbicides of known concern. The EPA imposed several restrictions and conditions on the use of acetochlor.

It is approved for pre-emergence application or for pre-planting application with soil incorporation, in corn. (maize) at 5 litres / hectare (1835g / hectare of a.i.) It is the main active ingredient in Acenit, Keystone, Guardian, Harness, Relay, Sacemid, Surpass, Top-Hand, Trophy and Winner.

It is used to control weeds in corn, and is particularly useful as a replacement for atrazine in the case of some important weeds.

Safety
Acetochlor has been classified as a probable human carcinogen. Acetochlor, as alachlor, can cause nasal turbinate tumors via the generation of a common tissue reactive metabolite that leads to cytotoxicity and regenerative proliferation in the nasal epithelium.

It is a thyroid disruptor.

Human health effects from acetochlor at low environmental doses or at biomonitored levels from low environmental exposures are unknown. A case of poisoning with extremely swollen genitals as a symptom was reported after contact.

Ecologic effects 
In the United States, acetochlor is the third most frequently detected herbicide in natural waters.

Acetochlor can accelerate metamorphosis in amphibians. It can also affect the development of fish.

See also
Metolachlor

References

External links
U.S. Environmental Protection Agency article on Acetochlor

Herbicides
Organochlorides
Ethers
Endocrine disruptors
Acetanilides